Kothandaramaswami Temple is a Hindu temple located at Nandambakkam, a suburb of Chennai, India. Dedicated to Rama, the spot is associated with the legendary sage Bhrigu.

History 
The temple was constructed by Vijayanagara Empire. The kings, initially, built shrines for Rama, Lakshmana and Sita. Later shrines were built for Srinivasa, Alwars, Hanuman, and other deities.

See also
 Religion in Chennai

References 

 

Hindu temples in Chennai
Rama temples